HaBonim or Habonim may refer to:

 Habonim Dror, a Socialist-Zionist youth movement 
 HaBonim, Israel, a moshav in Israel